Anko may refer to:

People 
 , Japanese emperor
 , father of modern karate
, karate master and contemporary of Itosu
Ankopaaingyadete (Anko), 19th-century Kiowa calendar artist

Fictional characters 
 , in the Naruto series
 , in the manga/anime Great Teacher Onizuka

Other 
 Anglerfish, in Japanese
 Red bean paste, called Anko (餡こ or 小豆)) in Japanese
 Anko, in-house brand name of retail chain Kmart in Australia